Volodarsky District may refer to:
Volodarsky District, Russia, several districts and city districts in Russia
Volodarskyi Raion (Volodarsky District), several districts in Ukraine

See also
Volodarsk (disambiguation)
Volodarsky (disambiguation)

District name disambiguation pages